Calder railway station served the town of Coatbridge, North Lanarkshire, Scotland from 1886 to 1943 on the Rutherglen and Coatbridge Railway.

History 
The station opened on 1 June 1886 by the Caledonian Railway. It had a goods yard that was served by a siding to the west. This siding also served Union Tube Works. The station closed on 1 January 1917 but reopened on 1 March 1919, before closing permanently on 3 May 1943.

References

External links 

Disused railway stations in North Lanarkshire
Former Caledonian Railway stations
Railway stations in Great Britain opened in 1866
Railway stations in Great Britain closed in 1917
Railway stations in Great Britain opened in 1919
Railway stations in Great Britain closed in 1943
1866 establishments in Scotland
1943 disestablishments in Scotland
Coatbridge